El Cairo is a district of the Siquirres canton, in the Limón province of Costa Rica.

History 
El Cairo was created on 19 September 1911 by Ley 11.

Geography 
El Cairo has an area of  km² and an elevation of  metres.

Locations
 Neighborhoods (Barrios): Francia
 Villages (Poblados): Ana, Bellavista, Boca Río Jiménez, Castilla, Cocal, Golden Grove, Josefina, Junta, Luisiana, Milla 3, Milla 4, Milla 5, Milla 6, Ontario, Peje, Seis Amigos, Silencio.

Demographics 

For the 2011 census, El Cairo had a population of  inhabitants.

Transportation

Road transportation 
The district is covered by the following road routes:
 National Route 32
 National Route 812

References 

Districts of Limón Province
Populated places in Limón Province